The Ryan Tubridy Show is a talk radio show, presented by Ryan Tubridy each weekday morning on RTÉ Radio 1 from 9am to 10am, from September 2015 to present.

Ryan rejoined the station after five years with RTÉ 2fm presenting Tubridy; he previously presented The Tubridy Show on RTÉ Radio 1 between 2005 and 2010.

References

External links
 The Ryan Tubridy Show at RTÉ Radio 1

Irish talk radio shows
2015 radio programme debuts